IK Sävehof is a Swedish handball team located in Partille. Their home matches are played at the Partille Arena which has a capacity of 4,000.

Women's team
The women's team competes in Svensk Handbollselit. They won the championship 15 times (1993, 2000, 2006, 2007, 2009, 2010, 2011, 2012, 2013, 2014, 2015, 2016, 2018 and 2022) which is the record. The 2016 championship title was the eight in a row. They won the Swedish cup in 2023.

They competed in the 2021–22 Women's EHF Champions League.

Kits

European record

Women's team
Squad for the 2022–23 season

Goalkeepers
 1  Johanna Bundsen
   Line Bergfeldt
Wingers
RW
 2  Ida Rahunen Sembe
 22  Carmen Martín
LW
 3  Stella Huselius
 10  Elin Ernelind
 19  Olivia Mellegård
Line players
 8  Johanna Forsberg
 15  Linn Johansson
 20  Thea Blomst

Back players
LB
 7  Elin Liljeros Heikka
 13  Irma Wester Kocanovic
 18  Laura Cecilie Jensen
CB
 11  Amanda Källström
 17  Mai Kragballe Nielsen
 29  Frida Rosell
RB
 9  Nina Koppang
 27  Thea Kylberg

Transfers
Transfers for the 2023-24 season 

Joining
 Thea Stankiewicz (LB) (from  Aarhus United)

Leaving
 Frida Rosell (CB) (to  ESBF Besançon)
 Mai Kragballe Nielsen (CB)

Top scorers in the EHF Champions League 
(All-Time) – Last updated on after the 2021/22 season

Men's team

The men's team competes in Handbollsligan. They won the championship seven times, in 2004, 2005, 2010, 2011, 2012, 2019 and 2021. They won the Swedish cup in 2022. Their best international result was the victory in 2013-14 EHF Challenge Cup. Their coach was Rustan Lundbäck from 2001/2002 until 2009/2010.

Kits

Men's team
Squad for the 2022–23 season

Goalkeepers
1  Oscar Sävinger
 12  Simon Möller
Wingers
LW
 8  Kelvin Roberts
 10  Alexander Westby
 17  Sebastian Spante
RW
 25  Malte Celander
 34  Sebastian Karlsson
Line players
 6  Adam Blanche
 7  Felix Möller
 19  Tryggvi Þórisson
 35  Philip Karlefeldt

Back players
LB
 11  Lasse Pedersen
 18  Pontus Brolin
 77  Lukas Rådberg
 78  Óli Mittún
CB
 5  Olle Ek
 31  William Andersson Moberg
 71  Elias Ellefsen á Skipagøtu
RB
 3  Emil Berlin
 22  Gzim Salihi
 28  Marcus Lennernäs

Transfers
Transfers for the 2023-24 season

Joining

Leaving
  Elias Ellefsen á Skipagøtu (CB) (to  THW Kiel)
  Sebastian Karlsson (RW) (to  Montpellier Handball)

Former players

Women's team
  Johanna Ahlm (2004–2009, 2016–2019)
  Jenny Alm (2011–2015)
  Linn Blohm (2008–2014)
  Johanna Bundsen (2007–2017)
  Edijana Dafe (2011–2015)
  Tina Flognman (1998–2003)
  Hanna Fogelström
  Annika Fredén
  Cecilia Grubbström (2004–2012)
  Isabelle Gulldén (2007–2011)
  Elin Hallagård (2012–2019)
  Jessica Helleberg
  Filippa Idéhn (2012–2015)
  Gabriella Kain (2000–2006)
  Olivia Mellegård (2015–2019)
  Ida Odén (2005–2015, 2016–2018)
  Jamina Roberts (2009–2014, 2016–2017, 2020–2022)
  Loui Sand (2011–2017)
  Frida Tegstedt (2006–2014)
  Ulrika Toft Hansen (2008–2010)
  Frida Toveby
  Teresa Utković (1998–2003, 2007–2009)

Men's team
  Kim Andersson (2001–2005)
  Tommy Atterhäll (2002–2007)
  Patrik Fahlgren (2002–2009)
  Johan Jakobsson (2005–2011, 2017–2019)
  Peder Järphag (1988–1993)
  Jonas Larholm (2000–2006, 2016–2019)
  Jan Lennartsson (2000–2007)
  Johan Petersson (1990–1996)
  Per Öberg (1988–1992)

Former coaches

Women's team

Men's team

References

External links
 

Swedish handball clubs
1950 establishments in Sweden
Handball clubs established in 1950
Sport in Västra Götaland County